Mon Mothma is a fictional character in the Star Wars franchise, primarily portrayed by actress Genevieve O'Reilly. Introduced as the leader of the Rebel Alliance in Star Wars: Return of the Jedi (1983), portrayed by Caroline Blakiston, Mothma has become a prominent character in subsequent prequel media, including The Clone Wars (2008–2014), and the films Star Wars: Revenge of the Sith (2005) and Rogue One (2016), and television series Rebels (2014–2018) and Andor (2022–present).

Appearances

Film

Return of the Jedi (1983)
The first onscreen appearance of Mon Mothma was in Return of the Jedi in 1983, portrayed for the only time by Caroline Blakiston. In this film, she explains to the rebels the plan to stop the Death Star.

Revenge of the Sith (2005)
A young Mothma, portrayed for the first time by Genevieve O'Reilly, appears in Star Wars: Episode III – Revenge of the Sith in a silent cameo appearance. In a deleted scene, in which she plays a larger role, Senator Mothma secretly meets with Senator Bail Organa of Alderaan and Senator Padmé Amidala of Naboo during the last days of the Galactic Republic. The group, known as the Delegation of 2000, discuss Chancellor Palpatine's growing authoritarianism and how to counter it in what would be early seeds of the Rebellion against the Empire.

Rogue One (2016)
Rogue One marks Genevieve O'Reilly's first on-screen appearance as Mon Mothma after her scene in Revenge of the Sith was removed from the final cut of the film, reprising the role after over a decade. Mothma tasks Rebel spy Cassian Andor with finding Galen Erso, the Imperial scientist who designed the Death Star.

Television

The Clone Wars (2010–2014)

Rebels (2017)
Mothma appears in several episodes in the animated series Star Wars Rebels, with O'Reilly reprising her role. While a member of the Imperial Senate, Mothma makes a speech where she publicly denounces Emperor Palpatine for the Empire's massacre of the Ghormans. The speech causes Mothma to leave the Imperial Senate and flee after being wanted by the Empire. She is then forced to publicly become the leader of the Rebel Alliance, calling for various Rebel cells across the galaxy to converge.

Andor (2022–present)

Novels

Lost Stars (2015)

Aftermath (2015)
Mothma was featured in Chuck Wendig's novel Aftermath. After the Rebel Alliance's victory at the Battle of Endor and the fall of the Empire's leadership, Mothma leads the formation of the democratic New Republic on her homeworld of Chandrila. Mothma took up the role of Chancellor of the New Republic. Seeking to not repeat the mistake of the old Galactic Republic's militarization, she proposed radical measures such as the New Republic to undertake demilitarization by 90%.

Reception
O'Reilly's portrayal of Mon Mothma has received a universally positive critical reception, while Blakiston's initial cameo role as the character has become an internet meme.

References

External links
 
 

Andor (TV series) characters
Female characters in film
Fictional chancellors
Fictional diplomats
Fictional military strategists
Fictional senators
Fictional republicans
Film characters introduced in 1983
Star Wars: The Clone Wars characters
Star Wars Anthology characters
Star Wars Rebels characters
Tales of the Jedi (TV series) characters